Tradedoubler is a digital marketing company based in Stockholm, Sweden. It was founded in 1999 by Felix Hagnö and Martin Lorentzon and was listed on the Stockholm Stock Exchange in 2005.

Company 
Tradedoubler has 15 offices in 10 countries: Sweden, United Kingdom, France, Germany, Switzerland, Netherlands, Spain, Italy, Poland and Singapore. It pioneered affiliate marketing and offers both an affiliate network and a technology tool.

History 
In September 1999, Martin Lorentzon and Felix Hagnö founded Netstrategy that later became Tradedoubler, the first European network to offer performance-based affiliate marketing services for advertisers and publishers. They developed a platform and infrastructure enabling merchants to create relationships with affiliates.

In 2000, Tradedoubler initiated a roll-out to all major European markets and by the end of that year the network was counting more than 260 affiliate programs in diverse fields and over 70,000 affiliates.

In 2001, Tradedoubler won the "Guldmusen" prize, one of the oldest IT prizes in Sweden, as the IT-rookie of the year for a patented platform for performance-based marketing and sales.

In 2002, Tradedoubler had reached profitability and doubled both revenue and gross profit, generating sales of more than €200 million for their advertisers during 2002.

In 2004, Crown Princess Victoria of Sweden presented Tradedoubler with the "Export Hermes" award in recognition of their successful export strategy. By this time, Tradedoubler had become Europe's leading supplier of online marketing and sales services to over 700 advertisers, almost half a million publishers and some of the leading agencies across Europe.

In 2005, Tradedoubler was listed on NASDAQ Stockholm and launched their white-label application, a global partner management platform that allows advertisers and agencies to track and manage their digital marketing activities. The application is powered by the same technology as Tradedoubler's public affiliate network and can be used as an in-house tracking and channel de-duplication platform or as an affiliate management tool.

In March 2006, Tradedoubler bought Advertigo, an advertising service created by Daniel Ek, the future founder of Spotify, for US$1.25 million. In April 2006, Lorentzon with Ek decided to start a new company and Daniel made Martin leave the Tradedoubler board of directors.

In 2007, Tradedoubler acquired Interactive Marketing Works Ltd and subsidiaries ('The IMW Group'). The IMW Group consists of two trading entities, 'The Search Works', a search engine marketing agency and 'The Technology Works', a technology provider for search engine marketing.

In 2012, Tradedoubler was the first pan European network to launch an integrated e-commerce and m-commerce affiliate offering covering consumers' changing behaviour to research and buy via mobile devices.

In April 2014, Tradedoubler appointed Matthias Stadelmeyer as CEO.

The same year, Tradedoubler launched a business intelligence tool providing advertisers with live information on program performance through customized dashboards visualizing data insights.

In January 2015, Tradedoubler acquired the independent German technology company, Adnologies, a data-driven advertising specialist.

In March 2015, Reworld Media became the principal owner of Tradedoubler by acquiring a 19,1 stake in the company.

In September 2015, Tradedoubler launched Cookieless tracking technology to allow online behavior to be tracked, even when a HTTP cookie is not present, by creating a device fingerprint.

In 2016, Tradedoubler launched User Journey Insights as part of their business intelligence tool for giving advertisers visibility of their online customer journeys from affiliate data to the full spectrum of their digital marketing activity. The company also launched Cross-Device Tracking, a service for analysis of the impact of marketing activity across desktop and mobile.

The same year Tradedoubler expanded their performance marketing offering to South East Asia with a new office in Singapore to develop performance marketing strategies across the Asian region. he company acquired R Advertising, an email marketing company.

In 2017, Tradedoubler acquired Metapic, a platform for product recommendation within influencer and premium lifestyle media. Six months later the platform has attracted 20,000 users with a reach of more than 2 million unique visitors per week in Sweden, Norway and Denmark. During 2018 Metapic has been rolled out in the UK, France, Germany, Poland, Spain and Italy.

In November 2018, Reworld Media announced a recommended public cash offer to the shareholders and held 40% of Tradedoubler's shares after the offer expired.

In March 2019, Tradedoubler announced its product vision of an open platform enabling automated and transparent direct relationships between advertisers and publishers using blockchain technology for the storage of data. The same month it presented a new publisher interface and API as the first applications based on the platform.

In October 2020, the company became a certified partner of TikTok in Europe.

In 2021, Grow by TradeDoubler partnered with PrestaShop to allow merchants to natively plug into the affiliate network.

Previous and current CEOs

Notes and references 

Software companies of Sweden
Affiliate marketing
Digital marketing companies
Companies based in Stockholm
Companies listed on Nasdaq Stockholm
1999 establishments in Sweden
Marketing companies established in 1999